György Czakó (11 July 1933 – 9 February 2023) was a Hungarian figure skater. He was a three-time (1951, 1952, 1954) Hungarian national champion. He represented Hungary at the 1952 Winter Olympics where he placed 12th. He was the father of Krisztina Czakó.

Career
György Czakó started skating at age 6 at the suggestion of a paediatrician. He won the Hungarian Figure Skating Championships three times and competed at the European Figure Skating Championships, the World Figure Skating Championships, and the 1952 Winter Olympics. He won the silver medal at the 1955 Winter Universiade. The Czako jump is named after him.

After his retirement from competitive skating, he toured professionally. He joined the Ice-Revue in 1958. He performed on numerous shows as the soloist of the Hungarian Ice-Revue and performed in the film Napfény a jégen. After the Ice-Revue closed, he worked as a mechanical engineer in a designing office. He also worked as a coach. He was the president of the Budapesti Korcsolyázó Egylet.

Personal life and death
Czakó died on 9 February 2023, at the age of 89.

Competitive highlights

References

External links 
 Official homepage
 

1933 births
2023 deaths
Hungarian male single skaters
Figure skaters at the 1952 Winter Olympics
Olympic figure skaters of Hungary
Figure skaters from Budapest